Volleyball has been in the Military World Games event since the first inaugural edition in 1995 in Rome, Italy, Ruled and managed by the International Military Sports Council Body, The tournament serve as a friendship competitions between military nations it is a biennial multi-sport event.

Indoor Volleyball

Men's tournaments

Summaries 

 A round-robin tournament determined the final standings.

Medal summary

Women's tournaments

Summaries 

 A round-robin tournament determined the final standings.

Medal summary

References

External links 
Official FIVB Website
Official CISM Website

 
Military World Games
Military World Games